Jo Hamilton  may refer to:

 Jo Hamilton (interior designer) British interior designer
 Jo Hamilton (musician) British musician
 Jo Hamilton (politician) (1827–1904) former California Attorney General

See also
Joseph Hamilton (disambiguation)
Hamilton (surname)